Bexagliflozin, sold under the brand name Brenzavvy, is an antidiabetic medication used to improve glycemic control in adults with type 2 diabetes as an adjunct to diet and exercise. It is a sodium-glucose cotransporter 2 (SGLT2) inhibitor that is taken by mouth.

Medical uses 
Bexagliflozin is indicated to improve glycemic control in adults with type 2 diabetes as an adjunct to diet and exercise.

Research 
A 96-week phase 2 clinical study of adults with type 2 diabetes showed that bexagliflozin monotherapy provided a durable, clinically meaningful improvement of glycemic control, with a substantial reduction in weight and blood pressure, but no increase in the rate of significant adverse events. In a clinical study of patients with type 2 diabetes and stage 3a/3b chronic kidney disease, bexagliflozin was well tolerated and shown to reduce hemoglobin A1c levels, body weight, systolic blood pressure and albuminuria.

Veterinary uses 
The data from two six-month field studies and an extended use field study demonstrated that bexagliflozin was over 80% effective in improving glycemic control in cats with diabetes mellitus.

Bexagliflozin, sold under the brand name Bexacat, is an antidiabetic medication used to improve glycemic control in cats with diabetes. Bexacat is the first sodium-glucose cotransporter 2 (SGLT2) inhibitor new animal drug approved by the US Food and Drug Administration (FDA) in any animal species. It was approved for medical use in the United States in December 2022. Bexacat is sponsored by Increvet Inc., based in Boston, Massachusetts. Elanco licensed development and commercialization rights for bexagliflozin from Bexcafe, an affiliate of Increvet.

References

Further reading

External links 
 

Anti-diabetic drugs
Cat medications
SGLT2 inhibitors
Chloroarenes
Cyclopropyl compounds
Ethers
Phenol ethers
Glucosides